This is a list of monuments in Azerbaijan.

A 

 Ahmadalilar Mausoleum
 Akhsadan Baba Mausoleum
 Alinja Tower
 Armenian cemetery in Julfa
 Ateshgah of Baku

B 

 Barda Mausoleum
 Basilica in Qum village

C 

 Chirag Gala

D 

 Diri Baba Mausoleum

G 

 Galarsan-Gorarsan
 Garabaghlar Mausoleum
 Garghabazar Caravanserai
 Garghabazar Mosque
 Gilahli Mosque in Shaki
 Guba Memorial Complex
 Gulustan Mausoleum

H 

 Haji Gayib’s bathhouse
 Huseyn Javid Monument

I 

 Imamzadeh (Ganja)
 Imamzadeh complex in Nakhchivan

J 

 Juma Mosque in Ordubad
 Juma Mosque in Sheki
 Juma Mosque of Nakhchivan

K 

 Khachin-Turbatli Mausoleum
 Khanegah tomb
 Khojaly Memorial (Baku)
 Kirna mausoleum

L 

 Lekh Castle

M 

 Maiden Tower (Baku)
 Mammadbayli Mausoleum
 Mausoleum of Huseyn Javid
 Mausoleum of Seyid Yahya Bakuvi
 Mausoleum of Sheikh Juneyd
 Mirali Mausoleum
 Momine Khatun Mausoleum
 Monument to Mirza Alakbar Sabir

N 

 Nakhchivan Memorial Museum
 Nardaran Fortress
 Nizami Mausoleum
 Noah’s Mausoleum (Nakhchivan, Azerbaijan)

P 

 Papravand Mausoleum
 Parigala

R 

 Ramana Tower

S 

 Shahbulag Castle
 Shaki Caravanserai
 Sheykh Babi Yagub Mausoleum
 Shirvan Domes

T 

 Treasury of Bahman Mirza
 Tuba Shahi Mosque

V 

 Vagif Mausoleum

Y 

 Yeddi Gumbaz mausoleum
 Yezidabad castle